Näpi is an alevik (borough) in Rakvere Parish, Lääne-Viru County, Northern Estonia.

References

Populated places in Lääne-Viru County
Boroughs and small boroughs in Estonia